is a city located in Niigata Prefecture, Japan. , the city had an estimated population of 81,836 in 34,883 households, and a population density of 187 persons per km².

Geography

Kashiwazaki is located in a coastal region of south-central Niigata Prefecture. Part of the city is within the borders of the Sado-Yahiko-Yoneyama Quasi-National Park. The highest elevation is the summit of Mount Gozu at 912 meters.

Surrounding municipalities
Niigata Prefecture
Jōetsu
Nagaoka
Tōkamachi
Izumozaki
Kariwa

Climate
Kashiwazaki has a Humid climate (Köppen Cfa) characterized by warm, wet summers and cold winters with heavy snowfall.

Demographics
Per Japanese census data, the population of Kashiwazaki has been declining for the past 30 years.

History
The area of present-day Kashiwazaki was part of ancient Echigo Province and developed as a post station on the Hokuriku-dō highway. Under the Tokugawa shogunate of Edo period Japan, parts of what is now Kashiwazaki were under the control of Shiiya Domain, a minor  fudai feudal domain ruled by a junior branch of the Hori clan, while other parts were tenryō territory under direct control of the shogunate, or were exclaves of Kuwana Domain (Ise Province), Kaminoyama Domain (Mutsu Province), Nagaoka Domain (Echigo Province) or Yoita Domain (Echigo Province). Pre-modern Kashiwazaki was located within the holdings of Kuwana Domain. The modern town of Kashiwazaki was established on April 1, 1889, within Kariwa District, Niigata with the establishment of the municipalities system. During the Meiji period, the discovery of petroleum in the area led to an economic boom and increase in population. Kashiwazaki was elevated to city status on 1 July 1940. (It was the fifth city created within Niigata Prefecture).

On November 1, 1968, Kashiwaza absorbed the village of Kurohime, followed by the town of Kitajō on May 1, 1971 (both from Kariwa District). The city annexed part of the town of Kakizaki (from Nakakubiki District) on April 1, 1989 and the towns of Nishiyama and Takayanagi (both from Kariwa District) on May 1, 2005.

2007 earthquake

On July 16, 2007, a magnitude 6.8 earthquake hit off the coast of Kashiwazaki, killing 11 people, and injuring more than 700, causing massive power outages, a tsunami warning, and other disasters. The quake forced the Kashiwazaki-Kariwa Nuclear Power Plant to shut down for 10 months as of May 2008.

Government

Kashiwazaki has a mayor-council form of government with a directly elected mayor and a unicameral city legislature of 26 members. The city contributes two members to the Niigata Prefectural Assembly. In terms of national politics, the city is part of Niigata 2nd district of the lower house of the Diet of Japan.

Economy and Industries
Kashiwazaki has traditionally been a center for commercial fishing, machinery, glassware and lumber processing. The city is home to the Kashiwazaki-Kariwa nuclear power plant, the largest nuclear generating station in the world by net electrical power rating.

Bourbon, a major confectionery company in Japan, is headquartered in Kashiwazaki.

Education

Colleges and universities
Niigata Institute of Technology
Niigata Sangyo University

Primary and secondary education
Kashiwazaki has 27 public elementary schools and 12 public middle schools operated by the city. There are five public high schools operated by the Niigata Prefectural Board of Education. The prefecture also operates two special education schools for the handicapped.

Transportation

Railway
 JR East - Shin'etsu Main Line
 -  -  -  -  -  -  -  -  - 
 JR East - Echigo Line
  -  -  -  -  -  -  -

Highway
 Hokuriku Expressway – Yoneyama IC, Kashiwazaki IC, Nishiyama IC

Sister city relations
 - Emeishan City, Sichuan, China, friendship city since August 2, 1994.

Local attractions

Shimoyachi Site, a National Historic Site.
 Kashiwazaki is host to many cultural events every year, including the Kaze no Jin festival in May, En Ma Ichi in June, DonGALA in July, and Gion, also in July.

Notable people from Kashiwazaki
 Akiko Yajima, voice actress
 Daisuke Sakaguchi, voice actor
 Hiroki Yagami, manga artist
 Ikue Ōtani, actress
 Ikuo Hirayama, former governor of Niigata Prefecture
 Makiko Tanaka, politician
 Kakuei Tanaka, politician and the 64th and 65th Prime Minister of Japan
 Makoto Ogawa, singer (former member of Morning Musume)
 Mihiro, singer and actress
 Motoei Shinzawa, manga artist
 Tsunesaburo Makiguchi, first president of Sōka Gakkai

References

External links

Official Website 

 
Cities in Niigata Prefecture
Populated coastal places in Japan